Dev Khanal (born 29 May 2005) is a Nepalese cricketer  He made his One Day International (ODI) debut for Nepal against Papua New Guinea in Kirtipur. He is the Captain of  Nepal Under19, in his captaincy Nepal qualifies for the u19 cricket World Cup 2024

References

2005 births
Living people
Nepalese cricketers
Nepal One Day International cricketers
People from Rupandehi District